Jason Alfaro (born November 29, 1977) is a former Major League/Minor League baseball player.

External links

1977 births
Living people
Baseball players from San Antonio
Buffalo Bisons (minor league) players
Gulf Coast Astros players
Hill College Rebels baseball players
Houston Astros players
Indianapolis Indians players
Kissimmee Cobras players
Leones del Caracas players
American expatriate baseball players in Venezuela
Major League Baseball shortstops
Michigan Battle Cats players
New Orleans Zephyrs players
Round Rock Express players
Syracuse SkyChiefs players